Rosario Isabel Dawson (born May 9, 1979) is an American actress and film producer. She made her feature-film debut in the 1995 independent drama Kids. Her subsequent film roles include He Got Game (1998), Josie and the Pussycats (2001), Men in Black II (2002), Rent (2005), Sin City (2005), Clerks II (2006), Death Proof (2007), Seven Pounds (2008), Percy Jackson & the Olympians: The Lightning Thief (2010), Unstoppable (2010), Zookeeper (2011), Trance (2013), Top Five (2014), and Zombieland: Double Tap (2019). Dawson has also provided voice-over work for Disney/Marvel, Warner Bros./DC Comics, and ViacomCBS's Nickelodeon unit.

Dawson is also known for having several roles in film and television adaptations of comic books. These include Gail in Sin City (2005) and Sin City: A Dame to Kill For (2014), Claire Temple in five of the Marvel/Netflix series (2015–2018), and providing the voices of Diana Prince/Wonder Woman in the DC Animated Movie Universe and Space Jam: A New Legacy and Barbara Gordon/Batgirl in The Lego Batman Movie. In 2020, she portrayed Ahsoka Tano in the second season of The Mandalorian and The Book of Boba Fett, and is set to star in the upcoming Disney+ original series Ahsoka. In 2021, she has a recurring role in the Dwayne Johnson autobiographical comedy series Young Rock and a main role in the Hulu miniseries Dopesick.

IndieWire named Dawson one of the best actors never to have received an Academy Award nomination.

Early life
Dawson was born on May 9, 1979, in New York City. Her mother, Isabel Celeste, is of Afro-Cuban and Puerto Rican ancestry. Isabel was 17 years old when Rosario was born; she never married Rosario's biological father, Patrick C. Harris. When Rosario was a year old, her mother married Greg Dawson, a construction worker. Isabel and Greg moved into a reclaimed building on 544 East 13th Street after being approved as members of an affordable housing plan. The family later moved to Garland, Texas.

Career
As a child, Dawson made a brief appearance on Sesame Street. At the age of 15, she was discovered on her front-porch step by photographer Larry Clark and Harmony Korine, with Korine deciding that she was perfect for a part he had written in his screenplay for the controversial 1995 film Kids. She went on to star in varied roles, including independent films and blockbusters such as Rent, He Got Game, and Men in Black II.

In 1998, Dawson provided an introductory voice-over for the remixed version of Prince's single "1999". The voice-over was a commentary on the state of the world in the next to last year before the new millennium. The following year, she appeared in The Chemical Brothers' video for the song "Out of Control" from the album Surrender. She is also featured on the track "She Lives In My Lap" from the second disc of the OutKast album Speakerboxxx/The Love Below, in which she speaks the introduction and a brief interlude towards the end.

In 2001, she appeared in the film Josie and the Pussycats as band member Valerie Brown and had a role in Chelsea Walls, the directorial debut of Ethan Hawke.

Dawson starred opposite Edward Norton in the Spike Lee drama 25th Hour (2002). In the 2004 Oliver Stone film Alexander, she played Roxana, the wife of Alexander the Great. In 2005, Dawson made her stage debut as Julia in the Public Theater's "Shakespeare in the Park" revival of Two Gentlemen of Verona.

In the film adaptation of the popular musical Rent in 2005, she played the exotic dancer Mimi Marquez, replacing Daphne Rubin-Vega, who was pregnant and unable to play the part.  For her role in Rent, Dawson won the Satellite Award for Best Supporting Actress – Motion Picture. She also appeared in the adaptation of the graphic novel Sin City, co-directed by Robert Rodriguez and Frank Miller, portraying Gail, a prostitute-dominatrix. Also that year, she appeared in a deleted scene in the Rob Zombie film The Devil's Rejects. The scene was included in the deleted scenes on the DVD release.

She starred as Becky in Clerks II (2006). In  Back to the Well, documentary about the making of the series,  she stated that the donkey show sequence was what made her decide to take the role. In May of the same year, Dawson co-created and co-wrote the comic-book miniseries Occult Crimes Taskforce. She was at the 2007 San Diego Comic-Con to promote the comic. She co-starred with former Rent alumna Tracie Thoms in the Quentin Tarantino throwback film Death Proof in 2007, part of the Tarantino/Robert Rodriguez double feature Grindhouse. She produced and starred in Descent alongside friend Talia Lugacy, whom she met at the Lee Strasberg Academy. On July 7, 2007, Dawson presented at the American leg of Live Earth.

In 2008, Dawson starred with Will Smith in Seven Pounds and in Eagle Eye, produced by Steven Spielberg. Beginning in August, she starred in Gemini Division, an online science-fiction series. In the computer-animated series Afterworld, she voiced Officer Delondre Baines. On January 17, 2009, Dawson hosted Saturday Night Live. Later in the year, she voiced Artemis of Bana-Mighdall in the animated film Wonder Woman.

In 2009, Dawson performed in The People Speak, a documentary feature film that uses dramatic and musical performances of the letters, diaries, and speeches of everyday Americans, based on historian Howard Zinn's A People's History of the United States. In 2009, Dawson also voiced the character of Velvet Von Black in Rob Zombie's animated feature, The Haunted World of El Superbeasto. For the Kasabian album West Ryder Pauper Lunatic Asylum, she is featured singing on the track "West Ryder Silver Bullet".

In 2010, she starred in the films Percy Jackson & the Olympians: The Lightning Thief as Persephone, and Unstoppable as railway yardmaster Connie. In 2013, she appeared in the independent film Gimme Shelter. The following year, she reprised her role as Gail in Sin City: A Dame to Kill For. In 2015, she played Claire Temple in the Netflix web television series Daredevil, a role which she reprised in Jessica Jones and Luke Cage. Dawson's likeness was also used in the Jessica Jones tie-in comic as her character on both shows. Dawson has continued this role in 2017 in Iron Fist and The Defenders.

She appeared in Top Five in 2014, for which she was nominated for the Critics' Choice Movie Award for Best Actress in a Comedy, and in 2018, she played the female lead role in the film Krystal. In 2020, she was cast as the Star Wars character Ahsoka Tano in the second season of The Mandalorian on Disney+ and reprised her role in The Book of Boba Fett. She will also reprise the role in the spinoff limited series, Ahsoka. In 2022, she reprised her role as Becky for Clerks III (2022).

Activism and advocacy

Politics

Dawson was arrested in 2004, while protesting against President George W. Bush.

Dawson endorsed Barack Obama for re-election in 2012, and Bernie Sanders for the Democratic nomination in the 2016 Democratic Party primaries. On April 15, 2016, Dawson was among the protesters arrested during Democracy Spring in Washington, DC.

In mid-2019, Dawson endorsed her boyfriend Cory Booker in the 2020 presidential election. Booker ended his campaign for president on January 13, 2020. Had she become First Lady of the United States, Dawson said she would have advocated for solutions to youth homelessness. On March 9, 2020, Dawson endorsed the presidential campaign of Bernie Sanders, whom she had also previously endorsed in his 2016 bid.

Philanthropy

Dawson is involved with the Lower East Side Girls Club and supports other charities such as environmental group Global Cool, One Campaign, Oxfam, Operation USA, Amnesty International, Parents, Families and Friends of Lesbians and Gays (PFLAG), the International Rescue Committee, Voto Latino, and Stay Close.org, a poster and public service advertising campaign for PFLAG, where she is featured with her uncle Frank Jump. She has participated in the Vagina Monologues (she refers to her vagina as "The General") and serves on the board for V-Day, a global non-profit movement that raises funds for women's anti-violence groups through benefits of this play.

In October 2008, Dawson became a spokeswoman for TripAdvisor.com's philanthropy program, More Than Footprints, Conservation International, Doctors Without Borders, National Geographic Society, The Nature Conservancy, and Save the Children. Also in October 2008, she lent her voice to the RESPECT! Campaign, a movement aimed at preventing domestic violence. She recorded a voice message for the Giverespect.org Web site, stressing the importance of respect in helping stop domestic violence. In 2012, Dawson partnered with SodaStream International in launching the first annual Unbottle the World Day, a campaign conceived in an effort to raise awareness to the impact of cans and plastic bottles on the environment.

Personal life
Dawson is a self-professed Trekkie, who mentioned both her brother's and her love of Star Trek in an interview with Conan O'Brien, and also demonstrated her knowledge of several Klingon words.

Dawson adopted a 12-year-old girl in 2014.

In March 2019, Dawson confirmed that she was in a relationship with US Senator Cory Booker. Their relationship ended in February 2022.

In 2018, Dawson made a post to Instagram that was widely perceived as her coming out as queer; when asked about this in a 2020 interview, she stated that this had not been her intention, and further specified that although "People kept saying that I [came out]... I didn’t do that, ... I mean, it’s not inaccurate, but I never did come out. I mean, I guess I am now ... I’ve never had a relationship in that space, so it’s never felt like an authentic calling to me.". A representative of Dawson later clarified to The Daily Beast that she meant to say she came out as an ally of the LGBTQ community.

Filmography

Film

Television

Music video

Video games

Audiobooks

Audio

Awards and nominations

See also

 List of Puerto Ricans

References

External links

 
 
 
 

1979 births
Living people
20th-century American actresses
21st-century American actresses
Actresses from New York City
American actresses of Puerto Rican descent
American entertainers of Cuban descent
American child actresses
American film actresses
American television actresses
American video game actresses
American voice actresses
American women philanthropists
American film producers
Hispanic and Latino American actresses
Lee Strasberg Theatre and Film Institute alumni
People from the Lower East Side
People of Afro–Puerto Rican descent
Philanthropists from New York (state)
20th-century squatters
Streamy Award winners
20th-century African-American women
20th-century African-American people
21st-century African-American women